Particulates, or atmospheric particulate matter, is microscopic solid or liquid matter suspended in the Earth's atmosphere.

Particulate, particulates or particulate matter may also refer to:

Particulate inheritance, a pattern of inheritance in evolutionary biology
Suspended solids, particulate matter suspended in liquid

See also
Particle
Colloidal particle
Granule (disambiguation) 
Micromeritics, the science and technology of small particles
Particulate pollution
Powder (substance)